"Old Alabama" is a song co-written and recorded by American country music singer Brad Paisley, featuring guest vocals from the band Alabama.  It was released in March 2011 as second single from Paisley's 2011 album This Is Country Music.

Content
When writing the song, Paisley thought that the bridge to Alabama's 1982 single "Mountain Music" would fit well with the song. Instead of sampling that song, he asked Alabama band members Randy Owen, Jeff Cook and Teddy Gentry to join him in the studio and record a piece of it.  Paisley wrote the song with Owen, Dave Turnbull and Chris DuBois.

"Old Alabama" incorporates into its lyrics the titles of several of Alabama's classic songs, including "Why Lady Why," "Tennessee River," "Feels So Right," "Love in the First Degree" and "Dixieland Delight." A man's illustration of his idea of spending time with a desirable woman on a Saturday night, the song references the names of Alabama songs that the couple are listening to on their way to an unnamed rendezvous. In the song's bridge, Owen, Cook and Gentry sing the bridge of "Mountain Music," in fact the same parts they did on their original 1982 hit. The song ends with a fiddle-heavy reprisal of "Old Alabama"'s refrain, which is musically in the vein of "Mountain Music."

Critical reception
Matt Bjorke of Roughstock rated the single three-and-a-half stars out of five, saying that the references to Alabama songs were "cleverly intertwined" and that the appearance of Alabama gave the song a "nostalgia" factor. Blake Boldt of Engine 145 thought that the tributes to the band Alabama were "admirable", but criticized the melody for sounding similar to his 2007 single "Online" and thought that it "leans heavily […] on song mentions and recycled production."

Music video
The music video was directed by Jim Shea and premiered in May 2011. It features the group Alabama plus clips from their music videos, and appearances from NASCAR drivers, Darrell Waltrip, Jeff Gordon, and team owners Rick Hendrick and Kelley Earnhardt Miller. The video was filmed in and around Charlotte, North Carolina.

Chart performance
"Old Alabama" entered the Hot Country Songs charts at number 44 on the chart dated for the week ending March 26, 2011. It has since become Alabama's first new number one hit since "Reckless" in 1993. It is also the seventeenth number one for Paisley.

Year-end charts

Certifications

References

2011 singles
2011 songs
Brad Paisley songs
Alabama (American band) songs
Songs written by Brad Paisley
Vocal collaborations
Song recordings produced by Frank Rogers (record producer)
Arista Nashville singles
Songs written by Chris DuBois
Songs written by Randy Owen
Songs written by Dave Turnbull
Songs about country music